= IRGC Imam Khamenei Naval University =

Iranian military academy

IRGC Imam Khamenei Naval University, Military academy is affiliated with the Islamic Revolutionary Guard Corps, located in the city Rasht, Iran.

Official University Emblem
